The Batatotalena Cave, also known as the Diva Guhava in Buddhist literature, is a cave system in Sudagala,  away from the town of Kuruwita, in the Sabaragamuwa Province of Sri Lanka.

Accessing the cave involves a  hike from Sudagala, and an additional  climb to reach the cave entrance. Approximately  from the cave is another partially submerged cave, which is accessible after a  swim.

In Buddhism, it is believed to be the cave in which the Buddha spent the day after placing his footprint on Adam's Peak, from where he supposedly proceeded to Dighavapi.

See also 
 Batadombalena

References 

Caves of Sri Lanka
Prehistoric Sri Lanka
Buddhist caves in Sri Lanka
Landforms of Ratnapura District
Archaeological protected monuments in Ratnapura District